Uria Timoteo Simango (born 15 March 1926)  was a Mozambican Presbyterian minister and prominent leader of the Mozambique Liberation Front (FRELIMO)  during the liberation struggle against Portuguese colonial rule. His precise date of death is unknown as he was extrajudicially executed (along with several other FRELIMO dissidents and his wife, Celina)
 by the post-independence government of Samora Machel.

FRELIMO
Simango was a founder member of FRELIMO, serving as Vice-President from its formation in 1962 until the time of the assassination of its first leader Eduardo Mondlane, in February 1969. Simango succeeded Mondlane as FRELIMO's president but, in the power-struggle following Mondlane's death, his presidency was contested. In April 1969  his leadership was replaced by a triumvirate comprising the Marxist hardliners Samora Machel and Marcelino dos Santos as well as  Simango. The late 1960s FRELIMO was blighted by fratricidal infighting with a number of party members dying of unnatural causes.

The triumvirate did not last; Simango was expelled from the Central Committee in November 1969, and Samora Machel and Marcelino dos Santos assumed total control. In April 1970, Simango left for Egypt where, with other dissidents like Paulo José Gumane (Frelimo's founding Deputy General Secretary), he became a leader of COREMO, another small liberation movement.

After the Portuguese Carnation Revolution in 1974, Simango returned to Mozambique and established a new political party, the National Coalition Party (PCN), in the hope of contesting elections with FRELIMO. He was joined in the PCN by other prominent figures of the Liberation movement and the FRELIMO dissidents: Paulo Gumane and Adelino Gwambe (also a founder member of FRELIMO), Father Mateus Gwengere and Joana Simeao.

FRELIMO opposed multi-party elections. The post-1974 Portuguese government handed over sole power to FRELIMO and Mozambique gained its independence on 25 June 1975. Samora Machel and Marcelino dos Santos took over as its first President and Vice-President. Graça Machel was appointed as Minister of Education and Joaquim Chissano as Minister of Foreign Affairs. Uria Simango was arrested and forced to make a 20-page public confession on 12 May 1975 at the FRELIMO base in Nachingwea, recanting and requesting re-education. Simango and the remainder of the PCN leadership never regained freedom. Simango, Gumane, Simeao, Gwambe, Gwengere and others were all secretly executed at some undetermined date during 1977-1980. Neither the place of burial nor manner of their execution have ever been disclosed by the authorities. Simango's wife, Celina Simango, was also separately executed sometime after 1981, and no details or dates for her death are on public record in her case either.

From the late 1970s, a bloody insurgency by RENAMO (Mozambique National Resistance) plunged the country into a devastating civil war. RENAMO was initially formed by the Rhodesian regime, but from 1980, in its most brutal phase, was sponsored by the Apartheid regime of South Africa: the insurgency in the 1980s was associated with widespread atrocities against civilians. Economic collapse and famine ensued, worsened by drought in the early 1980s. Following the death of Samora Machel in 1986, Joaquim Chissano gradually steered Mozambique back to a peace accord with RENAMO in 1992 and the restoration of democracy. Multi-party elections were finally held in 1994, twenty years after Simango's ill-fated PCN opposition party.

Simango's public recantation
Following his arrest (and abduction from Malawi) Simango was obliged to read out a 20-page forced public recantation in front of thousands of FRELIMO fighters. Simango's confession includes claims, accusing colleagues of being agents of Portuguese secret services, and of involvement in Mondlane's murder, which are no longer seriously credited, even among the present Mozambican leadership.

Mozambique's lost opposition
The exact circumstances and motivation for the wholesale liquidation of the PCN in the late 1970s and early 1980s has never been officially investigated by the post-1994 Mozambican authorities.

Simango had no connection with RENAMO having been imprisoned before its formation. It is also doubtful, given his pacifist leanings that he would have supported the abuses of civilians during that very brutal insurrection. He may nevertheless have been perceived by FRELIMO as a dangerous rallying point. This view is espoused by Rothwell in 2004 

"Dos Santos, a man loathed by Mondlane became vice-president.
Simango was later captured, interned and then secretly executed
in October 1979, an execution ordered by FRELIMO to prevent
him being used as a figurehead by the then emergent
rebel movement RENAMO. For many years the Frelimo government
did not acknowledge the extrajudicial killing of its former
members and even led his relatives to believe that he was still
alive".

Brief comments on the executions, in the context of human rights violation in this period in Mozambique, appear also in Maier 1992. President Samora Machel died in 1986. Few members of the 1975-1986
regime have commented publicly on the death of Simango; one notable exception is the hardliner Vice-President Marcelino dos Santos, who has spoken quite forthrightly; in a TV interview in 2005 he explained why the executions were kept secret:

" Because one must see that at that moment, and naturally, while we ourselves felt the validity of revolutionary justice, the one built and fertilised by the armed struggle of national liberation, there existed, nonetheless, the fact that one had already formed a state, albeit one where FRELIMO was the fundamental power. So it was that, perhaps, which led us, knowing precisely that many people would not be able to comprehend things well, to prefer to keep silent. But let me say clearly that we do not regret these acts because we acted with revolutionary violence against traitors and traitors against the Mozambican people".

As there was no judicial process, it  remains unclear what prompted the charge of treason. On his return to Mozambique in 1974, according to his biographer Ncomo, as leader of the PCN, Simango held tentative talks with white settler parties, in a bid to garner strategic support against one-party rule. This presaged a settlement like that negotiated five years later in the Lancaster House Agreement for multi-party elections in Zimbabwe but, in 1974, it was viewed as treasonous by Frelimo hardliners.

Joana Simeao and  Lazaro Kavandame, two of the executed political prisoners, had fled and surrendered to the Portuguese colonial authorities before 1974 (the latter in fear of his life). But  not Simango, Gumane or Gwengere who had simply moved to the rival Liberation movement COREMO. The strategic reason for executing Celina Simango, not a prominent political figure, years later in 1982, is even less clear. What the executed leaders had in common was membership of the 1974 opposition party (PCN) and the attempt to challenge FRELIMO hegemony and one-party rule through multiparty elections.

A biography of  Simango was published in 2004.

In 2006, Joana Simeao's husband, wishing to remarry after 30 years but unable to prove his status as a widower, sued her for desertion. Joana Simeao was defended against the charge of marital desertion by a government tribunal as there is still no official acknowledgment of her death or of Simango's.

References

1926 births
1979 deaths
Mozambican independence activists
Assassinated Mozambican politicians
Mozambican Presbyterians
FRELIMO politicians